Lycée Josy Barthel, abbreviated to LJBM, is a high school in Mamer, in south-western Luxembourg. It was opened in September 2003, and cost €67.4m to build.  It comprises 60 classrooms and 16 workshops, and has a capacity of 1,300 students.  It is named after Josy Barthel, winner of Luxembourg's only Olympic gold medal-winner and former cabinet member.

The first denomination of the highschool was Lycée technique Josy Barthel and has been changed into Lycée Josy Barthel on 1 September 2009. Since then the school offers all class from 7th to 1st degree (enseignement secondaire).

Footnotes

External links
 Lycée Josy Barthel official website

Josy Barthel
Buildings and structures in Mamer
Organisations based in Mamer
Educational institutions established in 2003
2003 establishments in Luxembourg
Educational institutions in Luxembourg